Vargtimmen Pt. 2: Ominous Insomnia  is the fourth album by Wyrd, released in 2004 by Solistitium Records.

Re-released in 2006 by Omvina with different artwork.

Track listing

Credits
Narqath – All Instruments and Vocals

References

Wyrd (band) albums
2004 albums